Rumney is a district and community in the east of the city of Cardiff, Wales. It lies east of the Rhymney River, and is historically part of Monmouthshire. On 1 April 1938 the Cardiff Extension Act 1937 incorporated it into the county borough of Cardiff, although it remained part of Monmouthshire, and England until the Local Government Act 1972 made Monmouthshire a part of Wales.

Description

This is a predominantly residential area with a variety of social and private housing. There a many places of worship in the area, local shops, beauty salons and Café's, Rumney has a community charity based at Brachdy House called Rumney Forum, which is also home to the charity A Better Fit-School Uniform Donation.There are many shopping outlets on Newport Road as well as local shops at the top of Rumney Hill. New industrial and business estates have been developed alongside existing ones on Lamby Way providing employment opportunities.

Within the older sectors of the Rumney area are places of interest, such as the historic Rumney Pottery which is still in use today and also the remains of the old Rumney Castle which was a major stronghold on the South Wales coast. The  remains of the castle were excavated in the late 70s and early 80s. An old quarry which is now being used as a children's park is situated off Ty Mawr Road (Ty Mawr – Welsh language for "Big House")

The Church in Wales parish church of St Augustine, dating from the 12th century, is located on the north side of Church Road. Schools in the area include Eastern High School and St Illtyd's Catholic High School.

The Rompney Castle pub, with a mock-medieval tower, was built on Wentloog Road in 1871. It closed due to the 2020-2021 Coronavirus lockdown. Plans to demolish it and replace it with apartments were rejected in 2022 by Cardiff Council planners.

Transport
The area is on Cardiff Bus' 44/45 routes between Cardiff Central bus station and St Mellons and the 49/50 routes to Llanrumney. It is also served by the 30 service to Newport bus station.

Governance
Rumney is both an electoral ward, and a community of the City of Cardiff.  There is no community council for the area. The electoral ward of Rumney lies within the parliamentary constituency of Cardiff South and Penarth. It is bounded by the electoral wards of Pontprennau & Old St. Mellons to the north; Trowbridge to the east; Splott to the southwest; Penylan to the west; and Llanrumney to the northwest.

References

External links
 Geograph.co.uk photos of Rumney and surrounding area

Communities in Cardiff
Cardiff electoral wards
History of Monmouthshire